Maartje Nevejan (born in Utrecht, Netherlands) is a Dutch  documentary filmmaker, best known for multimedia productions like 14 and one stations, Couscous & Cola. and The National Canta Ballet

Background 
Nevejan performed in theater for 10 years and has been working as a director in the media since 1997.  She studied acting at Stella Adler in New York City and with the Peter Brook company in Rome, Italy in the ‘80s.  She graduated from the Amsterdamse Toneelschool & Kleinkunstacademie in Amsterdam, Netherlands in 1987.

Career 
Nevejan acted for Art & Pro for Frans Strijards (Handke, Strijards, Chekhov), and performed in several other theater groups and tv productions.  She formed her own group “De Akteurs” from 1991–1997, and switched to documentary filmmaking in 1997.  She has worked for KRO, BRT, BNN, Al Jazeera and Human.

Partial filmography 
As filmmaker
 14 and one stations, (15 episodes 1999-2000), KRO, BRT, Finland
 Come with me in the Void, (2001) (30 min BRT, KRO
 Esperanza Divina, (2001) (90 min. video)
 Just the way it is supposed to be, (2002) (30 min. AIDS-Congress Barcelona)
 Virtual Fatherlands, (2003) (50 min. documentary), Viewpoint Fiction Value, Festival, show, short film
 Couscous and Cola to America, (8 episodes, 2004)
 Double portrait (2004) (BNN, short documentary)
 Youngsters and the news, (2006) (FunX/BNN)
 Couscous and Cola to Africa, (9 episodes, 2007) (BNN)
 Couscous Global website, (265 minimovies, 2008)
 Theo van Gogh? Die is dood, (59 min., Collumn/HUMAN, 2009)
 The other Sudan, (2009) (Museumpiece Leiden)
 Sophie and Saar, (2009) (15 min., IDFA)
 De Prik en Het Meisje (2011) ( 58 min., HUMAN/IDTV); also known as "Once upon a vaccination"; official selection Nederlands Film Festival 2011
 De Inboorling: (2011, Viewpoint/Leesmij)
 Het Nationale Canta Ballet:(2012, Viewpoint/NTR)
 'Wij zitten vast' (2015) (tv series BNN, 8x40 min.)
 'Harry, Tiny en Sonja' (2015) (58 min, HUMAN)
 'Ik ben er even niet'/'Are You There? (2019) (92 min/58 min VPRO)
Descending the Mountain, (2021) (50 min. documentary MNP)

 As actress
 Ornithopter (1985)
 Broos (1997)
 12 steden, 13 ongelukken (1 episode, 1991) (TV)
 De weg naar school (1 episode, 1993) (TV)

Recognition 
When Couscous & Cola received the 2005 'Silver Zebra' Media Award, the jury announced "Hele spannende televisie. Prachtige verhalen. Soms schrijnend. Zet de doelgroep aan het denken. Een moderne roadmovie. Flitsende beelden, snelle montages." (Very exciting television. Beautiful stories. Sometimes poignant. Put the audience thinking. A modern road movie. Flashing images, rapid montages.)

Awards and nominations 
 1997,  Dutch Academy Award Golden Calf for Best Actress at the Netherlands Film Festival for Broos
 2001, 14 stations, ecce homo was nominated 'Best Film' at the Trento Film Festival
 2005, Zilveren Zebra (Silver Zebra), Dutch Media Award for Couscous & Cola
 2005  Nominated for a Golden Rose at the Rose d'Or Competition in the category ’Social Awareness Award’ for Couscous & Cola
 2008, Nominated for an Emmy Award for Couscous & Cola part2: Africa
 2019 Nominated Gouden Kalf, best documentary 2019
 2019 InScience International Film Festival, winner Vakjury award best documentary'Ik ben er even niet'
 2020 Dutch Directors Guild Interactive Award, with Niki Smit for 'In my absence'

References

External links 
 
 Couscous Global official website
 Official website (Dutch)

Living people
Dutch documentary filmmakers
Dutch film actresses
Golden Calf winners
Mass media people from Utrecht (city)
Women documentary filmmakers
Year of birth missing (living people)